Stenocercus ornatissimus, the lesser ornate whorltail iguana, is a species of lizard of the Tropiduridae family. It is found in Peru.

References

Stenocercus
Reptiles described in 1858
Endemic fauna of Peru
Reptiles of Peru
Taxa named by Charles Frédéric Girard